The Myrtle Beach Freedom were a professional indoor football team based in Myrtle Beach, South Carolina, and played their home games at the Myrtle Beach Convention Center. They were a member of American Indoor Football for one season until the league ceased operations in the summer of 2016.

The Freedom were the second indoor football team to call Myrtle Beach home, following the Myrtle Beach Stingrays of the National Indoor Football League, which only played part of the 2003 season in Myrtle Beach before moving to Florence, South Carolina, the following season.

History
The Freedom had originally joined X-League Indoor Football (X-League), but the Freedom were forced to choose a new league after the X-League ceased operations. The Freedom joined American Indoor Football (AIF) in October, 2015.

On April 19, 2016, the Freedom replaced coach Ryan David with Terry Foster. Coach David, along with two assistant coaches, resigned from the team in protest of what they considered dangerous conditions for their players. Coach Foster came from the recently defunct travelling team, the Steel City Menace.

Following the conclusion of the 2016 season, the AIF announced that it was ceasing operations, thus leaving the Freedom without a league. The Freedom's assets ended up in the hands of the Myrtle Beach Sharks, who wore the Freedom's uniforms throughout their brief existence in Arena Pro Football.

In March 2017, the Freedom and the AIF were sued for providing unsafe field conditions during their May 23, 2016, home game against the Columbus Lions. Two of the Lions' players, Christopher Donnell Smith and David Toussaint, claim the turf came loose from the floor, which then caught their feet causing permanent damage to their knees and ending their careers.

Final roster

Final staff

Statistics and records

Season result

Head coaches' records

2016 season

Key:

Exhibition
All start times were local to home team

Regular season
All start times were local to home team

Standings

Playoffs
When the playoff schedule was initially announced, the Freedom were set to play the Southern Division's second-seeded Florida Tarpons. On May 30, the Freedom replaced the Northern Division's fourth-seeded Central Penn Capitals against the West Michigan Ironmen. The Freedom's former position was replaced by the Southern Division's fourth-seed, the Savannah Steam.

References

External links
Myrtle Beach Freedom official website
American Indoor Football official website

American football teams in South Carolina
Former American Indoor Football teams
Sports in Myrtle Beach, South Carolina
American football teams established in 2015
American football teams disestablished in 2016
2015 establishments in South Carolina
2016 disestablishments in South Carolina